Song Sun-mi (born 28 May 1990 in Kunpo City) is a professional squash player who represents South Korea. She reached a career-high world ranking of World No. 41 in September 2010.

References

External links 
 
 
 

1990 births
Living people
South Korean squash players
Asian Games medalists in squash
Asian Games bronze medalists for South Korea
Squash players at the 2010 Asian Games
Squash players at the 2014 Asian Games
Medalists at the 2010 Asian Games
Medalists at the 2014 Asian Games
People from Gunpo
Sportspeople from Gyeonggi Province